Wamena Airport  is an airport serving the town of Wamena, Jayawijaya Regency, Highland Papua, Indonesia. The airport also serves the neighboring Lanny Jaya Regency and Tolikara Regency. It is currently the only airport in the highland region of Papua that can accommodate narrow-body aircraft such as the Airbus A320, Boeing 737 and C-130 Hercules.

Improvement

Recently, a new terminal was inaugurated by President Joko Widodo. The new terminal, which resembles the traditional Papuan home honai, was inaugurated on 30 December 2015. The new terminal which has an area of 4.000 m2 replaced the old run-down terminal which only has an area of 965 m2. Moreover, the runway is also being extended from 2,175 m to 2,400 m. Further improvement involves the building of a parallel taxiway in the airport.

Facilities of the new terminal includes 5 counter check-in, new boarding lounge with air conditioning, larger toilet and more seats in the boarding lounge. Air-side facilities include an apron which has two aircraft stands covering an area of 180 m x 45 m and 356 m x 45 m each. The airport runway has a length of 2,175 m, which would be extended to 2,400 m and eventually to 2,600 m.

Airlines and destinations

Passenger

Cargo

Accidents and incidents
On 15 August 1984, an Airfast Indonesia Douglas C-47A PK-OBC crashed into a mountain near Wamena. Two of the three people on board were killed.
 On April 21, 2002, an Antonov An-72 (ES-NOP) of Estonian airline Enimex was damaged in a hard landing at Wamena Airport; a minor fire broke out. Due to the dead battery of the fire truck some firefighters ran to the accident scene with hand-held fire extinguishers. After some 20 minutes the truck's battery was charged, but the aircraft had to be written off. There were no fatalities.
 On 9 April 2009, an Aviastar BAe 146-300 PK-BRD, flew into a mountain near Wamena, after a failed second approach for landing at Wamena Airport.
 On 26 September 2011, the airport was razed by fire; all buildings including the departure and arrival terminals were engulfed by fire.
 On December 18, 2016, an Indonesian Air Force C-130H Hercules flew into hills 1700 m southeast of the runway threshold while attempting to land in poor visibility, killing all 13 on board.
 On July 18, 2017, a Boeing 737-300F (Freighter) (PK-YGG) of Indonesian airline Tri-MG Intra Asia Airlines sustained substantial damage after a hard landing and subsequent runway excursion. The aircraft came to a stop on rough terrain. No injuries were reported.

Gallery

References

External links 
Wamena Airport - Indonesia Airport global website

Airports in Highland Papua